The Diocese of Sacramento is a Latin Church ecclesiastical territory or diocese of the Catholic Church in the northern California region of the United States. The diocese's see is Sacramento, it is led by a bishop who pastors the mother church of the diocese, the Cathedral of the Blessed Sacrament. Originally a major part of the defunct Grass Valley Diocese (which included several counties in northern California and Nevada), the present-day diocese was established by Pope Leo XIII  on May 28, 1886.

The Diocese of Sacramento is a suffragan diocese in the ecclesiastical province of the metropolitan Archdiocese of San Francisco.  Its fellow suffragans include the Dioceses of Honolulu, Las Vegas, Oakland, Reno, Salt Lake City, San Jose, Santa Rosa and Stockton.

The current bishop of Sacramento is Jaime Soto,  who was named coadjutor in October 2007 and succeeded Bishop William Weigand on Sunday November 30, 2008.

Territory
The Diocese of Sacramento contains the counties of Siskiyou, Modoc, Trinity, Shasta, Lassen, Tehama, Plumas, Glenn, Butte, Sierra, Colusa, Sutter, Yuba, Nevada, Yolo, Placer, Solano, Sacramento, El Dorado, and Amador, and is headquartered in Sacramento, California.

Bishops
The lists of bishops and their terms of service:

Bishops of Sacramento
 Patrick Manogue (1886–1895)
 Thomas Grace (1896–1921)
 Patrick Joseph James Keane (1922–1928)
 Robert John Armstrong (1929–1957)
 Joseph Thomas McGucken (1957–1962), appointed Archbishop of San Francisco
 Alden John Bell (1962–1980)
 Francis Anthony Quinn (1979–1993)
 William Keith Weigand (1993–2008)
 Jaime Soto (2008–present)

Coadjutor bishops
 Joseph Thomas McGucken (1955-1957)
 Jaime Soto (2007-2008)

Auxiliary bishops
 Patrick Joseph James Keane (1920–1922), appointed Bishop of Sacramento
 John Stephen Cummins (1974–1977), appointed Bishop of Oakland
 Alphonse Gallegos, O.A.R. (1981–1991)
 Richard John Garcia (1997–2006), appointed Bishop of Monterey in California
 Myron Joseph Cotta (2014–2018), appointed Bishop of Stockton

Other priests of this diocese who became bishop
 Richard Brendan Higgins, appointed auxiliary bishop of the US military in 2004

Churches

The Diocese of Sacramento has more than 150 parish and mission churches spread over 20 counties. A list of these churches is found at List of churches in the Roman Catholic Diocese of Sacramento.

Education
 the diocese had about 13,000 pupils in its schools.

High schools
Christian Brothers High School, Sacramento
Cristo Rey High School, Sacramento
Jesuit High School, Carmichael
Mercy High School, Red Bluff
St. Francis High School, Sacramento
St. Patrick-St. Vincent High School, Vallejo

Closed high schools
Bishop Manogue High School, Sacramento (Closed after 1992–1993 school year). Merged with Christian Brothers High School to create a coed campus.
Bishop Quinn High School, Palo Cedro (closed after 2007–2008 school year) 
Loretto High School, Sacramento (closed after 2008–2009 school year)
St. Stephen Academy, Sacramento (closed after 2008–2009 school year)

Closed seminaries
St. Pius X Minor Seminary, Rio Dell (1955-1961) then Galt (1961-1978)

Media
The Diocese of Sacramento owns Radio Santísimo Sacramento, which operates KCVV in Sacramento and KPYV in Oroville.

Reports of sex abuse
In April 2019, the Diocese of Sacramento provided the names of 46 priests and deacons who were credibly accused of sexually abusing 130 minors and adults, ages 25 or younger, from 1950 to 2019. From May to December 2019, the Diocese of Sacramento provided numerous documents to California State Attorney Xavier Becerra in preparation for a series of pending lawsuits which are expected to be filed after a new California law which will temporarily remove the statute of limitations goes into effect on January 1, 2020. The Diocese of Sacramento is one of six Catholic dioceses throughout the state of California which is expected to be subpoenaed in the upcoming lawsuits.

See also

 Catholic Church by country
 Catholic Church in the United States
 Ecclesiastical Province of San Francisco
 Global organisation of the Catholic Church
 List of Roman Catholic archdioceses (by country and continent)
 List of Roman Catholic dioceses (alphabetical) (including archdioceses)
 List of Roman Catholic dioceses (structured view) (including archdioceses)
 List of the Catholic dioceses of the United States
 Sacramento Chinese Catholic Community

References

External links
 Roman Catholic Diocese of Sacramento official website

 
Sacramento
1886 establishments in California
Sacramento
Sacramento